Michael Dunne (1800 – 20 September 1876) was an Irish Liberal, Whig and Independent Irish Party politician.

He was a farmer and lived in Ballymanus, Stradbally, Queen's County, a house and land the family rented from the Grattans. Michael's son William Dunne (1843-1915) was a racehorse trainer and bred two consecutive Irish Derby winners (Soulouque in 1879 and King of the Bees in 1880) and Cortolvin who went on to win the 1867 Grand National.

Michael was a Justice of the Peace.

Dunne became an Independent Irish Party MP for Queen's County at the 1852 general election and, standing as a Whig in 1857 and a Liberal in 1859, held the seat until 1865 when he did not seek re-election.

References

External links
 

1800 births
1876 deaths
Irish Nationalist politicians
Irish Liberal Party MPs
Whig (British political party) MPs for Irish constituencies
Members of the Parliament of the United Kingdom for Queen's County constituencies (1801–1922)
UK MPs 1852–1857
UK MPs 1857–1859
UK MPs 1859–1865